Silvo Plut (May 29, 1968 – April 28, 2007) was a Slovenian serial killer. He was sentenced to 30 years in prison for the murder of Ljubica Ulčar and the attempted murder of her husband Miro Ulčar on February 24, 2006. Plut had been released on probation after 13 years in prison for the 1990 rape and murder of a former schoolmate, Marjanca Matjašič. He committed suicide in his prison cell on April 28, 2007.

Crimes 
Plut killed his first victim, Marjanca Matjašič, on February 16, 1990, in Slovenia. He was sentenced to 15 years in prison. In 2003, he was released on parole.

He killed his second victim, 25-year-old Jasmina Đošić, on November 18, 2004, in Aleksinac, Serbia. He escaped to Slovenia, which refused extradition in spite of a warrant from Serbia.

He killed his third victim, Ljubica Ulčar, 25, on February 24, 2006, also wounding her husband Miro Ulčar.

On October 2, 2006, a Ljubljana, Slovenia court sentenced Plut to 30 years in prison for killing Ulčar. On April 26, 2007, a court in Niš, Serbia sentenced him in absentia to 40 years in prison for killing Đošić.

He committed suicide in his Ljubljana prison cell on April 28, 2007, by overdosing on sleeping pills.

See also
List of serial killers by country

References

External links 
 http://www.scp.nl/ess/eventnet/event.asp?id=287
 http://24ur.com/bin/article.php?article_id=3081267

1968 births
1990 crimes in Slovenia
2007 deaths
2007 suicides
2003 crimes in Slovenia
2004 crimes in Slovenia
2006 crimes in Slovenia
2000s murders in Slovenia
Drug-related suicides in Slovenia
Male serial killers
People convicted in absentia
People convicted of murder by Serbia
People convicted of murder by Slovenia
People from Novo Mesto
Prisoners who died in Slovenian detention
Serial killers who committed suicide in prison custody
Slovenian people convicted of murder
Slovenian people who died in prison custody
Slovenian rapists
Slovenian serial killers
Violence against women in Slovenia
Violence against women in Serbia